Michel Chrétien  (born March 26, 1936) is a Canadian medical researcher specializing in neuroendocrinology research at the Institut de recherches cliniques de Montréal, or Clinical Research Institute of Montreal, (IRCM). He is a younger brother of former Canadian prime minister, Jean Chrétien.

Early life and education
Born in Shawinigan, Quebec. He is the brother of Jean Chrétien, who was Prime Minister of Canada from 1993 to 2003. He received a Bachelor of Arts degree from the Séminaire de Joliette in 1955, a M.D. from the Université de Montréal in 1960, and a Master of Science from McGill University in 1962. He did post-graduate studies from 1962 to 1964 at Harvard University and from 1964 to 1967 at the University of California, Berkeley and University of California, San Francisco.

Career and research
In 1967, Chrétien opened a laboratory on polypeptide hormones at the Clinical Research Institute of Montreal (CRIM),  where he would remain until 1999.  His research proposed that peptide hormones are produced from large precursor proteins. He was an Associate Member, Experimental Medicine at McGill University from 1969 to 1999. In 1999 he was scientific director and CEO of the Loeb Health Research Institute at the Ottawa Civic Hospital.

Chrétien was a Professor of Medicine in the Faculty of Medicine at the Université de Montréal from 1975 to 1999. He was Chief of Endocrinology at Hôtel-Dieu de Montréal. In 1998, he was appointed a Professor, Department of Medicine, Faculty of Medicine, University of Ottawa. In 2006, he was appointed Senior Scientist of Hormone, Growth and Development at the Ottawa Health Research Institute.

Honours
In 1986, he was made an Officer of the Order of Canada in recognition for being "at the forefront of Canadian scientific research and an international leader in the field of neuroendocrinology". In 1994, he was made an Officer of the National Order of Quebec and promoted to the grade of Grand Officer on 16 June 2022. In 2004, he was made a Chevalier of the Légion d'honneur and was promoted to Officer in 2011. In 1981, he was made a Fellow of the Royal Society of Canada. In 1996, he was made a Fellow of the American Association for the Advancement of Science. He has received honorary degrees from University of Liège (1980), Paris Descartes University (1992), Laurentian University (1996), University of Guelph (1999), and Memorial University of Newfoundland (2000). In 2009, he was elected a Fellow of the Royal Society In 2017 he was made a member of the Canadian Medical Hall of Fame.

References

External links
 Michel Chrétien at The Canadian Encyclopedia

1936 births
Living people
People from Shawinigan
Harvard University alumni
McGill University alumni
Academic staff of McGill University
University of California, Berkeley alumni
University of California, San Francisco alumni
Université de Montréal alumni
Academic staff of the Université de Montréal
Academic staff of the University of Ottawa
Canadian medical researchers
Canadian endocrinologists
Officers of the National Order of Quebec
Grand Officers of the National Order of Quebec
Officiers of the Légion d'honneur
Fellows of the American Association for the Advancement of Science
Fellows of the Royal Society of Canada
Canadian Fellows of the Royal Society